Bagasi-ye Yek (also Romanized as Bagasī-ye Yek) is a village in Golestan Rural District, in the Central District of Sirjan County, Kerman Province, Iran. At the 2006 census, its population was 55, in 14 families.

References 

Populated places in Sirjan County